The 1986 Southwest Conference women's basketball tournament was held March 5–8, 1986, at Moody Coliseum in Dallas, Texas. 

Number 1 seed Texas defeated 2 seed  77-53 to win their 4th championship and receive the conference's automatic bid to the 1986 NCAA tournament.

Format and seeding 
The tournament consisted of a 6 team single-elimination tournament. The top two seeds had a bye to the Semifinals.

Tournament

References 

Southwest Conference women's Basketball Tournament
1986 in American women's basketball
Basketball in Dallas
1986 in sports in Texas